is a former Japanese football player, who played as a midfielder.

Playing career
Kobayashi was born in Niigata Prefecture on January 3, 1979. After graduating from high school he joined local Regional Leagues club Albirex Niigata in 1997. The club was promoted to the Japan Football League in 1998 and the J2 League in 1999. Although he made appearances for the club in each season he was with them, he was never a regular player. He retired at the end of the 2001 season.

Club statistics

References

External links

1979 births
Living people
Association football people from Niigata Prefecture
Japanese footballers
J2 League players
Japan Football League (1992–1998) players
Albirex Niigata players
Association football midfielders